George Lambert (born September 4, 1968, Sanford, Maine) is an American politician from the state of New Hampshire. A member of the Republican Party, Lambert served in the New Hampshire House of Representatives.

He is affiliated with the Free State Project.

Lambert unsuccessfully ran for the 18th district of the New Hampshire Senate in the 2014 elections.

He considered running for Governor of New Hampshire in the 2014 election.

Lambert lives in Litchfield, New Hampshire.

References

External links
Official page at the New Hampshire General Court
Campaign site
 

1968 births
Living people
Republican Party members of the New Hampshire House of Representatives
People from Litchfield, New Hampshire
People from Sanford, Maine
21st-century American politicians